The 1969 West Virginia Mountaineers football team represented West Virginia University in the 1969 NCAA University Division football season.  West Virginia completed the regular season with a 9–1 record and traveled to the Peach Bowl, where they beat the South Carolina Gamecocks, 14–3. They finished with a ranking of 17 in the AP Poll and 18 in the Coaches Poll.

Schedule

Roster

References

West Virginia
West Virginia Mountaineers football seasons
Peach Bowl champion seasons
West Virginia Mountaineers football